Gustaw Bator (17 April 1907 – 13 May 1955) was a Polish footballer. He played in three matches for the Poland national football team from 1931 to 1932.

References

External links
 

1907 births
1955 deaths
Polish footballers
Poland international footballers
Place of birth missing
Association football midfielders
Garbarnia Kraków players